The Perth Blue Wings are a Canadian Junior ice hockey team based in Perth, Ontario.  They formerly played in the Eastern Ontario Junior Hockey League.  The Blue Wings became a privately owned franchise in May 2013.

Between 2014-15 and the end of the 2019-2020 seasons, the EOJHL and the CCHL set a new agreement  in an attempt to create a better player development model. This resulted in the league re-branding itself as the Central Canada Hockey League Tier 2 (CCHL2), and shrinking to 16 teams and two divisions. The league reverted to the Eastern Ontario Junior Hockey League for 2021. The league also went from 4 divisions to 2 divisions and the Blue Wings were assigned to the Richardson Division.

Season-by-season results

External links
CCHL2 Webpage
Perth Blue Wings on Twitter
	 	

Eastern Ontario Junior B Hockey League teams
Ice hockey clubs established in 1936
1936 establishments in Ontario
Lanark County